Nirbandhamer Jora Khun (Double Murder in Nirbandham) is a Bengali mystery thriller film directed by Sayantan Ghosal. The film was released on 25 October 2020 under the banner of Zee Telefilms.

Plot
The plot revolves a mysterious double murder case in a house named Nirbandham. Actress Riyanka's husband and her father in law were killed there. Lady police officer Shibani investigates the case.

Cast
 Tanushree Chakraborty as Shibani Gupta
 Falaque Rashid Roy as Riyanka
 Indrasish Roy as Sajib Sen
 Joy Badlani as Bajoria
 Souman Bose as Inspector Ajit Roy

References

2020 films
2020 crime thriller films
Bengali-language Indian films
2020s Bengali-language films
Films postponed due to the COVID-19 pandemic
Film productions suspended due to the COVID-19 pandemic
Indian thriller films

External links